Francisco Elías Duclós Flores (born 29 January 1996) is a Peruvian footballer.

Career

In 2016, Duclós returned to Alianza Lima, Peru's most successful club, after being sent on loan to the reserves of Spanish La Liga side Celta de Vigo.

References

External links
 Francisco Duclós at Soccerway

Peruvian footballers
Living people
Association football defenders
1996 births
Peru youth international footballers
Footballers from Lima
Celta de Vigo B players
Club Alianza Lima footballers